The 2013 Survivor Series was the 27th annual Survivor Series professional wrestling pay-per-view (PPV) event produced by WWE. It took place on November 24, 2013, at the TD Garden in Boston, Massachusetts. Eight matches were contested at the event, including one on the Kickoff pre-show.

The main event saw Randy Orton defeat Big Show to retain the WWE Championship. In other prominent matches, John Cena defeated Alberto Del Rio to retain the World Heavyweight Championship and CM Punk and Daniel Bryan defeated The Wyatt Family's Luke Harper and Erick Rowan.

The pay-per-view was the worst-selling edition of Survivor Series since the event's inception in 1987; this was attributed to a weak buildup. It received 179,000 buys, down from 212,000 for the previous year's event; and attracted more than 100,000 fewer orders than the 2011 event, which generated 281,000 buys.

Production

Background
Survivor Series is an annual gimmick pay-per-view (PPV), produced every November by WWE since 1987. The second longest running pay-per-view event in history (behind WWE's WrestleMania), it is one of the promotion's original four pay-per-views, along with WrestleMania, Royal Rumble, and SummerSlam, referred to as the "Big Four". The event is traditionally characterized by having Survivor Series matches, which are tag team elimination matches that typically pits teams of four or five wrestlers against each other. The 2013 event was the 27th event in the Survivor Series chronology and was scheduled to be held on November 24, 2013, at the TD Garden in Boston, Massachusetts.

Storylines
The professional wrestling matches at Survivor Series featured professional wrestlers performing as characters in scripted events pre-determined by the hosting promotion, WWE. Storylines between the characters played out on WWE's primary television programs, Raw and SmackDown.

The main feud heading into Survivor Series featured Randy Orton and Big Show over the former's WWE Championship. Since returning from an injury in mid-August, Big Show had been speaking out against COO and the on-screen regime of Triple H and Stephanie McMahon and their mistreatment of several Superstars, especially Daniel Bryan. This put him at odds with "The Authority", and as a result, Big Show was continuously humiliated by Triple H and McMahon throughout September, and was obliged to knock out several other rebellious wrestlers, owing to a threat of being fired. At Battleground on October 6, Big Show interfered in a match between Orton and Bryan for the vacant WWE Championship, and knocked both competitors out, ruling out the match a no contest. The next night on Raw, he was fired from WWE by McMahon in storyline, but returned later that night to knock out Triple H in defiance. Big Show continued to "illegally" appear over the next several weeks on Raw, assisting Bryan, knocking out Raw general manager Brad Maddox, and costing The Shield's Seth Rollins and Roman Reigns their WWE Tag Team Championship. On the October 21 episode of Raw, Big Show announced he was filing a lawsuit against WWE for wrongful termination from his contract, and two weeks later won an "out-of-court negotiation" with Triple H and Stephanie over his lawsuit, and was rehired by WWE on the condition he promised not to sue them further and received a match against Orton for the WWE Championship at Survivor Series.

The event included two traditional Survivor Series elimination matches, the first of which saw the five-man team of The Shield (United States Champion Dean Ambrose, Seth Rollins, and Roman Reigns) and The Real Americans (Antonio Cesaro and Jack Swagger with manager Zeb Colter) face off against WWE Tag Team Champions Cody Rhodes and Goldust, Jimmy Uso and Jey Uso, and Rey Mysterio who made a surprise return on the November 18 episode of Raw. The second elimination match pitted Natalya, The Bella Twins (Brie Bella and Nikki Bella), The Funkadactyls (Naomi and Cameron), Eva Marie, and JoJo against Divas Champion AJ Lee, Tamina Snuka, Kaitlyn, Alicia Fox, Rosa Mendes, Aksana and Summer Rae. This match stems from AJ insulting Natalya and the rest for taking part in the Total Divas reality show.

The other world title in the company was also on the line at Survivor Series, as John Cena defended his World Heavyweight Championship against Alberto Del Rio. After suffering an elbow injury in August, Cena was to be sidelined from action for a minimum of four months. Despite this, SmackDown general manager Vickie Guerrero surprised then-World Heavyweight Champion Del Rio on the October 7 episode of Raw, by naming Cena as his opponent at the Hell in a Cell pay-per-view. At the event, Cena defeated Del Rio to win his third World Heavyweight title, and his fourteenth World title overall. A rematch between the pair was announced for Survivor Series in early November.

Another major rivalry pitted CM Punk and Daniel Bryan against The Wyatt Family, an enigmatic backwoods cult composed of Luke Harper and Erick Rowan, led by the faction's namesake, Bray Wyatt. Since their debut in July, The Wyatt Family had been targeting and attacking several wrestlers, including Kane, Kofi Kingston and The Miz, all in cause of Bray Wyatt exalting his character's preachings and ideals. On the October 28 episode of Raw, the Wyatt Family attacked Bryan backstage, and later attacked Punk in the ring. With Punk and Bryan aiding each other and showing resistance, their altercations with The Wyatts continued over the next several weeks on Raw and SmackDown, until an official match between the teams was announced for Survivor Series.

Also confirmed prior to the event was a match between Kofi Kingston and The Miz for the Survivor Series Kickoff pre-show. On the November 18 episode of Raw, during a match with The Real Americans (Antonio Cesaro and Jack Swagger), The Miz turned against his tag team partner, Kofi Kingston, and walked out of the match. This action allowed Swagger to apply the Ankle Lock on Kingston which he tapped out of giving the win to the Real Americans.

Also on the November 18, 2013, episode of Raw, Big E Langston defeated Curtis Axel to win the Intercontinental Championship, and a rematch was later confirmed for the pay-per-view.

Event

The Survivor Series Kickoff pre-show included the panel of Josh Mathews, Bret Hart, Booker T and Mick Foley previewing the matches. Also on the pre-show, The Miz defeated Kofi Kingston after a Roll-up.

Preliminary matches
The pay-per-view began with Triple H and Stephanie McMahon coming to the stage, with the two declaring they were allowing no interference in any match tonight.

In the first match, Cody Rhodes, Goldust, The Usos (Jey and Jimmy) and Rey Mysterio faced The Shield (Dean Ambrose, Roman Reigns, and Seth Rollins) and The Real Americans (Antonio Cesaro and Jack Swagger) in a traditional Survivor Series elimination match. Ambrose was eliminated by Rhodes with a roll up. Swagger was eliminated by Jey after a 619 by Mysterio, a Superkick by Jimmy and a Samoan Splash by Jey. Cesaro was eliminated by Rhodes with a roll up. Jimmy was eliminated by Reigns after a Spear. Rhodes was eliminated by Reigns after a Spear. Jey was eliminated by Rollins after a Curb Stomp. Rollins was eliminated by Mysterio with a Roll Up. Goldust was eliminated by Reigns after a Spear. Mysterio was eliminated by Reigns after a Spear, leaving Reigns as the sole survivor.

Next, Big E Langston defended the WWE Intercontinental Championship against Curtis Axel. Big E pinned Axel after a Big Ending to retain the title.

After that, Team Total Divas (Natalya, The Bella Twins, The Funkadactyls, JoJo and Eva Marie) faced Team True Divas (Divas Champion AJ Lee, Tamina Snuka, Kaitlyn, Alicia Fox, Aksana, Rosa Mendes and Summer Rae) in a traditional Survivor Series elimination match. Fox was eliminated by Naomi after a Split-Legged Moonsault. Cameron was eliminated by Mendes after Mendes tripped Cameron into a Turnbuckle. Mendes was eliminated by Nikki after a Bella Buster. Rae was eliminated by Nikki after a Running Single Leg Dropkick. Marie was eliminated by Kaitlyn after a Fireman's Carry Gutbuster. Naomi was eliminated by Kaitlyn after a Fireman's Carry Gutbuster. Kaitlyn was eliminated by Brie after a Missile Dropkick. Brie was eliminated by Aksana after a Divo Drop. Aksana was eliminated by Nikki after a Rack Attack. JoJo was eliminated by AJ after a Samoan Drop by Tamina. Tamina was eliminated by Natalya after submitting to the Sharpshooter. AJ was eliminated by Natalya after submitting to the Sharpshooter, leaving Natalya and Nikki as the survivors. Despite this, it was announced that Natalya was the sole survivor after commentator JBL said that Nikki had been eliminated.

Ryback came to the ring issuing an open-challenge, with Mark Henry answering the challenge. Henry pinned Ryback after a World's Strongest Slam to win the match.

In the fifth match, John Cena defended the World Heavyweight Championship against Alberto Del Rio. During the match, Cena attempted a Five Knuckle Shuffle on Del Rio but Del Rio performed a DDT on Cena for a near-fall. Cena attempted an Attitude Adjustment on Del Rio but Del Rio countered the move and performed a Bridging German Suplex on Cena for a near-fall. The match ended when Del Rio applied the Cross Armbreaker on Cena but Cena escaped the hold and pinned Del Rio after an Attitude Adjustment to retain the title.

After that, CM Punk and Daniel Bryan faced Luke Harper and Erick Rowan. During the match, Punk and Bryan performed a double Belly to Back Suplex on Rowan for a near-fall. Punk and Bryan performed a Hart Attack on Harper for a near-fall. Rowan performed a Running Splash on Bryan for a near-fall. Punk performed a Diving Elbow Drop on Harper for a near-fall. In the end, Bryan performed a Running Knee on Rowan and Punk pinned Harper after a GTS to win the match.

Main event
In the main event, Randy Orton defended the WWE Championship against Big Show. During the match, Orton attempted an RKO but Big Show countered and performed a Chokeslam on Orton for a near-fall. After the referee was knocked down, Big Show performed a KO Punch on Orton. The Authority distracted Big Show, allowing Orton to perform an RKO on Big Show. Orton pinned Big Show after a Punt Kick to retain the title. After the match, John Cena confronted Orton. Cena raised the World Heavyweight Championship whilst Orton raised the WWE Championship as the event ended.

Aftermath 
The following night on Raw, WWE Champion Randy Orton came out to talk to The Authority (Triple H and Stephanie McMahon) about causing a distraction in his title defense against Big Show when he was interrupted by World Heavyweight Champion John Cena, who proposed a match against Orton to unify both world titles to determine the undisputed WWE world champion. Triple H agreed and made it a Tables, Ladders and Chairs match at TLC. Orton won the match and became the first WWE World Heavyweight Champion, which kept the lineage of the WWE Championship while the World Heavyweight Championship was retired.

Also later that night, The Shield (United States Champion Dean Ambrose, Seth Rollins, and Roman Reigns) faced three members of the opposing survivor series team members in Rey Mysterio and the WWE Tag Team Champions The Rhodes Brothers and were victorious after Ambrose pinned Cody Rhodes. Later that night, The Shield attacked CM Punk after Punk and Daniel Bryan won a match by disqualification against all three members of The Wyatt Family (Bray Wyatt, Luke Harper, and Erick Rowan), who would drag Bryan off before Punk was attacked by The Shield. As a result, two 3-on-1 handicap matches were set at TLC. Punk defeated The Shield while Bryan lost to The Wyatt Family.

On the December 2 episode of Raw, Natalya pinned AJ, to secure a victory for her team in a six-Diva tag team match. After this string of non-title wins, Natalya was officially announced to challenge AJ for the Divas Championship at the TLC event.

Another rematch was the 7-on-7 Divas Survivor Series Elimination Tag Team match would happen.

The 2013 Survivor Series was the last Survivor Series to include the World Heavyweight Championship, as at the following month's TLC: Tables, Ladders & Chairs event, the title was unified with the WWE Championship, which was renamed to the WWE World Heavyweight Championship.

Results

Survivor Series elimination matches

References

External links 
 

2013
Events in Boston
Entertainment events in Boston
2013 in Boston
Professional wrestling in Boston
2013 WWE pay-per-view events
November 2013 events in the United States